Nady Systems, Inc. is a professional and consumer audio product manufacturer founded in 1976 by John Nady. Nady Systems develops and manufactures a variety of audio equipment, including products using wireless microphone technology. Nady Systems sells audio equipment for use in the entertainment industry, and for use in houses of worship, schools and universities.

Company history
In the early 1970s, John Nady developed and patented a companding process for wireless which significantly improved sound quality and range. Nady began offering this product for sale in wireless microphones in 1976. Nady founded a company, Nasty Cordless, Inc., which changed its name to Nady Systems in 1978.

Nady’s original marketing was focused strictly on the entertainment industries. By 1985, many top-performing musical artists used Nady Systems' wireless equipment, including Madonna, Bruce Springsteen, Bon Jovi, Aerosmith, Styx, Neil Young and the Rolling Stones. 

Nady System's products have also been used in producing broadcast television content, including the Golden Globe Awards, Grammy Awards, and The Lawrence Welk Show. Nady Systems' work in television has been recognized by the National Academy of Television Arts and Sciences, which awarded Nady Systems an Emmy Award  in 1996 for “Outstanding Technical Achievement in Pioneering Wireless Microphone Technology.”

Nady is credited with developing a number of innovations in the field of wireless audio. Its innovations include the first in-ear monitor system (1978), the first ultra-light wireless head microphone for professional stage performance (1984), the first wireless guitar and bass with built-in transmitter (1986), and the first PLL synthesized UHF frequency agile wireless system (1991).

References

External links
John Nady NAMM Oral History Interview (2010)

Microphone manufacturers
Audio equipment manufacturers of the United States